Zhongzhou Road, literally meaning Central Axis, refers to a stretch of road in Beijing, China.

"Zhongzhou Road" is not the name of any particular road; it refers to the trunk road from Beichen Bridge on the northern 4th Ring Road through to Zhonglou North Bridge on the northern 2nd Ring Road (north stretch) and south of Yongdingmen (south stretch).

In the Ming and Qing Dynasties Beijing's Central Axis is in turn from north to south, Drum Tower and Bell Tower, Wanning Bridge, Di'anmen Gate (in 1954 demolition), Jingshan, Shenwumen Gate, Forbidden City, Wumen Gate, Duanmen Gate, Tian'anmen Gate,  Tian'anmen Square, the Gate of China (in 1954 demolition), Qianmen Gate, Tianqiao, Yongdingmen Gate.

Landmarks

Streets in Beijing